Crepis phoenix is a Chinese species of flowering plant in the tribe Cichorieae within the family Asteraceae. It has been found only in the Province of Yunnan in southern China.

Crepis phoenix is a perennial herb up to 70 cm tall, with a large taproot. It produces a flat-topped  array of numerous small flower heads. Each head has as many as 25 yellow ray florets but no disc florets. The species grows on mountain slopes.

References

External links
Flora of China, 万丈深 wan zhang shen Crepis phoenix Dunn full-page line drawing

phoenix
Endemic flora of China
Flora of Yunnan
Plants described in 1903